Rainey's shrew (Crocidura raineyi) is a species of mammal in the family Soricidae. It is endemic to Kenya.  Its natural habitat is subtropical or tropical moist lowland forests.

Sources
 Oguge, N., Hutterer, R. & Howell, K. 2004.  Crocidura raineyi.   2006 IUCN Red List of Threatened Species.   Downloaded on 30 July 2007.

Rainey's shrew
Mammals of Kenya
Endemic fauna of Kenya
Rainey's shrew
Taxonomy articles created by Polbot
Taxa named by Edmund Heller